The surname Rak or Rák may refer to:

Nikola Rak (born 1987), Croatian footballer
Richmond Rak (born 1985), Ghanaian-Swiss footballer
Róbert Rák (born 1978), Slovak footballer
Štěpán Rak (born 1945), Rusyn-born Czech classical guitarist and composer